You Mean the World to Me is the debut extended play (EP) by British singer-songwriter Freya Ridings. It was released through labels Good Soldier Songs, AWAL and Capitol Records on 1 March 2019, alongside the single release of the title track "You Mean the World to Me". The EP's second single, "Lost Without You", was a commercial success, peaking at nine on the UK Singles Chart in October 2018.

Track listing

References

2019 debut EPs
Freya Ridings albums
Albums produced by Greg Kurstin